The Western Herald is the student newspaper of Western Michigan University, in Kalamazoo, Michigan.  It began printing in 1916. The paper was known as the Western Normal Herald from 1916 to 1927. It provides news about the students, campus events and activities, as well as sporting events, opinion sections, and local culture and politics.

The Western Herald is different from many student newspapers. It receives a small amount of funding through a student activity fee as part of the Student Media Group ballot initiative passed in 2013. The ballot initiative also secured funding for WIDR and Young Broadcasters of Tomorrow (YBOT), now Western Herald Video. The funding is split between the three groups in an effort to solidify the student representation on campus through various media outlets.

During the fall and winter semesters the Western Herald prints twice a month and online daily. During the summer semester and over winter break, the Western Herald does not print but does publish online content.

The Western Herald maintains a staff of approximately 35–40 students. The whole of the Western Herald is entirely student-driven and student-run. The editorial content and design is decided by the student staff.

The Western Herald is the oldest registered student organization (RSO) at Western Michigan University.

References

External links
 Official site
 http://justprintme.com/westernherald/

Western Michigan University
Student newspapers published in Michigan